La Cadena is a mountain in the Frigiliana municipality of the Province of Málaga in southern Spain, in the Sierra de Almijara.

Location

La Cadena is one of the main peaks of the Sierras of Tejeda, Almijara and Alhama Natural Park.
The rocks are firm, but may be slippery and dangerous if they are wet or icy.
At the summit there is a hunting reserve sign and a small iron cross, both well-embedded in the rock.

Geology

The Sierra de Almijara is a rough mass of marble mountains with sharp ridges that stretches east from the Puerto de Cómpeta.
The mountains contain narrow ridges separated by deep valleys cut by the streams and rivers, resulting in many small sub-basins.
All of the park has the calcareous formations of the Subbética region, with marbles, shales, phyllites, etc.
The area is rich in quartzite and gneiss over 300 million years old.
The Sierra de Almijara holds one of the Spain's main sources of dolomitic marble.
The marble gives white and gray tones to the ridges and ravines.

Notes

Sources

Mountains of Andalusia